Suffrica is a genus of spiders in the family Zodariidae. It was first described in 2015 by Henrard & Jocqué. , it contains 3 species from Kenya and Tanzania.

References

Zodariidae
Araneomorphae genera
Spiders of Africa